Montreal Royals may refer to:
Montreal Royals, the AAA affiliate of the Brooklyn Dodgers
Montreal Royales, a professional baseball team in the Canadian Baseball League
Royal Montreal Hockey Club, or 'Montreal Royals', a hockey team in the Quebec Junior and Senior Hockey Leagues
Montreal Royals (football), a football team of the Interprovincial Rugby Football Union, a predecessor of the Canadian Football League
Montreal Royal, a basketball team in the American Basketball Association
Montreal Royal (AUDL), an Ultimate team in the American Ultimate Disc League